Progressive Dissidence (DP) was a political party in Portugal.

History
The party was established in 1905 by Minister of Justice José Maria de Alpoim as a left-wing breakaway from the Progressive Party. It won nine seats in the April 1906 parliamentary elections, but was reduced to four seats in the August 1906 elections. The 1908 elections saw the party win seven seats.

The party was dissolved in 1910.

References

Defunct political parties in Portugal
Political parties established in 1905
Political parties disestablished in 1910
1905 establishments in Portugal
1910 disestablishments in Portugal
Liberal parties in Portugal